"Turn This Club Around" is a song by German dance band R.I.O., featuring vocals from pop, R&B and hip-hop singers U-Jean and Tony T. The song was written by Yann Peifer, Manuel Reuter, Neal Anthony Dyer and Andres Ballinas. It was released in Germany as a digital download on 16 September 2011.

Music video
A music video to accompany the release of "Turn This Club Around" was first released onto YouTube on 15 September 2011 at a total length of three minutes and twenty-seven seconds.

Track listing
UK Digital download
 "Turn This Club Around" (Video Edit) – 3:21
 "Turn This Club Around" (Extended Mix) – 5:19
 "Turn This Club Around" (Crystal Lake Radio Edit) – 3:38
 "Turn This Club Around" (Money G Radio Edit) – 3:10
 "Turn This Club Around" (Kardinal Beats Radio Edit) – 3:22
 "Turn This Club Around" (Pokerface Radio Edit) – 3:29
 "Turn This Club Around" (Astrixx Radio Edit) – 3:13

Credits and personnel
Lead vocals – Tony T. and U-Jean
Producers – Yann Peifer, Manuel Reuter
Lyrics – Yann Peifer, Manuel Reuter, Andres Ballinas
Label: Kontor Records

Charts

Weekly charts

Year-end charts

Certifications

Release history

References

External links
 R.I.O. on Myspace

2011 singles
2011 songs
R.I.O. songs
Songs written by DJ Manian
Songs written by Yanou
Songs written by Andres Ballinas
Number-one singles in Switzerland
Kontor Records singles